The striped swamp snake, also known as the African swamp snake, is a species of colubrid snake. It is one of two members of the genus Dromophis.  It is found in several African countries, including Burkina Faso, Senegal, Guinea-Bissau, Mali, Ivory Coast, Togo, Ghana, Benin, Niger, Nigeria, and Cameroon.

References

 GBIF
Boulenger, G.A. 1896. Catalogue of the snakes in the British Museum, Vol. 3. London (Taylor & Francis), xiv + 727 pp.
Broadley, D.G. 1983. Dromophis Peters 1869 (Reptilia, Serpentes): proposed conservation under the plenary powers. Z.N.(S.) 2375 Bull. zool. Nomencl. 40 (3): 189-190
Chirio, Laurent and Ivan Ineich 2006. Biogeography of the reptiles of the Central African Republic. African Journal of Herpetology 55(1):23-59.
Duméril, A. M. C., BIBRON, G. & DUMÉRIL, A. H. A., 1854. Erpétologie générale ou histoire naturelle complète des reptiles. Tome septième. Deuxième partie, comprenant l'histoire des serpents venimeux. Paris, Librairie Encyclopédique de Roret: i-xii + 781-1536
Fitzinger, L. 1843. Systema Reptilium, fasciculus primus, Amblyglossae. Braumüller et Seidel, Wien: 106 pp.
Günther, A. 1865. Fourth account of new Species of Snakes in the Collection of the British Museum. Ann. Mag. Nat. Hist. (3) 15: 89–98.
Günther, A. 1858. Catalogue of Colubrine snakes of the British Museum. London, I - XVI, 1 - 281
Hughes, B. 1983. African snake faunas. Bonn. Zool. Beitr. 34: 311-356

Colubrids
Reptiles described in 1837